The 1991 Long Distance Series was the 15th season of this series, with half the races being held at the Fuji International Speedway. This is the first season where races were held away from Fuji, hence the dropping of “Fuji” from the title.

Long Distance

Results

References

JSPC seasons
Fuji Long Distance Series seasons